Kali Yug: Goddess of Vengeance ( and also known as Vengeance of Kali) is a 1963 Italian fantasy film directed by Mario Camerini and starring Paul Guers.

Cast
 Paul Guers – Dr. Simon Palmer
 Senta Berger – Catherine Talbot
 Lex Barker – Maj. Ford
 Sergio Fantoni – Ram Chand
 Klaus Kinski – Saddhu
 Ian Hunter – Robert Talbot
 I. S. Johar – Gopal
 Claudine Auger – Amrita
 Joachim Hansen – Lt. Collins
 Michael Medwin – Capt. Walsh
 Roldano Lupi – Maharadja d'Hasnabad
 Alfio Caltabiano – The Crie
 Luciano Conversi – Kanchan
 Paul Muller – Botanist Alamian

References

External links

1963 films
1960s fantasy adventure films
1960s Italian-language films
Italian fantasy adventure films
West German films
Films directed by Mario Camerini
Films set in the British Raj
Films released in separate parts
Films set in India
1960s Italian films